The Moscow City Duma is the regional parliament (city duma) of Moscow, a federal subject and the capital city of Russia. As Moscow is one of three federal cities, the city duma's legislation can only be overridden by the mayor and the federal government.

History
The original municipal legislature was established in 1785.

In 1917, the Mossoviet was established as a parallel administration in the city following the February Revolution. After the October Revolution where the Bolsheviks seized power, it was established as the city administration and replaced the Moscow City Duma.

In 1993, following a presidential decree, the Moscow City Duma was re-established.

Composition
The Moscow City Duma consists of 45 deputies who are elected for five-year terms from single-member districts.

From 1993 to 2001, the deputies were elected by single-member districts. From 2005 to 2009, 20 deputies were elected on party lists, and 15 from single-seat districts. From 2009 to 2014, 18 deputies were elected on party lists, and 17 from single-member districts. Since 2014, all 45 deputies are elected from single-member districts.

The last election was held in 2019.

Electoral districts

Latest election

List of elections
 12 December 1993
14 December 1997
 16 December 2001
 4 December 2005
 11 October 2009
 14 September 2014
 8 September 2019
 By-elections in 2021-2023

List of chairmen

List of deputies
7th convocation (2019–2024)

See also
 Government of Moscow
 Administrative divisions of Moscow
 Charter of the city of Moscow

Notes

References

External links
 Website

 
Legislatures of the federal subjects of Russia